Claude Roy may refer to:

 Claude Roy (physician) (born 1928), physician from Quebec, Canada
 Claude Roy (poet) (1915–1997), French poet and essayist
 Claude Roy (politician) (born 1952), politician from Quebec, Canada

See also
 Claude Le Roy (born 1948), French football manager and former player